Melarhaphe neritoides, common name : the small periwinkle,  is a species of small sea snail, a marine gastropod mollusc in the family Littorinidae, the winkles or periwinkles.

This species was previously known as Littorina neritoides.

Melarhaphe is a monotypic genus, in other words, this is the only species in that genus.

Description
This is a tiny species with the size of an adult shell varying between 4 mm and 9 mm. It has a high pointed spire. The dark aperture is oval. The purple-brown spiral band can be clearly seen on the body whorl.

The small periwinkle breeds in late winter. Its pelagic egg capsules release planktonic larvae.

Distribution
This species is found in European waters from Norway down south, in the Atlantic Ocean along the Azores, Canary Islands, Cape Verde, Morocco, Mauritania; in the Mediterranean Sea and the Black Sea.

References

 WoRMS info

Further reading 
 Backeljau, T. (1986). Lijst van de recente mariene mollusken van België [List of the recent marine molluscs of Belgium]. Koninklijk Belgisch Instituut voor Natuurwetenschappen: Brussels, Belgium. 106 pp
 Reid, D.G. (1989) The comparative morphology, phylogeny and evolution of the gastropod family Littorinidae. Philosophical Transactions of the Royal Society of London, Series B 324: 1-110.
 Britton J. C. (1995) "The relationship between position on shore and shell ornamentation in 2 size-dependent morphotypes of Littorina striata, with an estimate of evaporative water-loss in these morphotypes and in Melarhaphe neritoides". Hydrobiologia 309: 129-142. abstract.
 Howson, C.M.; Picton, B.E. (Ed.) (1997). The species directory of the marine fauna and flora of the British Isles and surrounding seas. Ulster Museum Publication, 276. The Ulster Museum: Belfast, UK. . vi, 508
 de Kluijver, M.J.; Ingalsuo, S.S.; de Bruyne, R.H. (2000). Macrobenthos of the North Sea [CD-ROM]: 1. Keys to Mollusca and Brachiopoda. World Biodiversity Database CD-ROM Series. Expert Center for Taxonomic Identification (ETI): Amsterdam, The Netherlands. . 1 cd-rom pp
 Kantor Yu.I. & Sysoev A.V. (2006) Marine and brackish water Gastropoda of Russia and adjacent countries: an illustrated catalogue. Moscow: KMK Scientific Press. 372 pp. + 140 pls.
 Cabral-Oliveira J., Maranhão P. & Pardal M. Â. (June 2009) "The effect of sewage discharge on Melarhaphe neritoides (Gastropoda: Littorinidae) population dynamics". Scientia Marina 73(2): 259-267. 
 Reid D.G. (2011) The genus Echinolittorina Habe, 1956 (Gastropoda: Littorinidae) in the eastern Atlantic Ocean and Mediterranean Sea. Zootaxa 2974: 1–65.
 Kadolsky D. (2012) Nomenclatural comments on non-marine molluscs occurring in the British Isles. Journal of Conchology 41(1): 65-90. 
 Fourdrilis S., Mardulyn P., Hardy O. J., Jordaens K., de Frias Martins A. M., Backeljau T. (2016) "Mitochondrial DNA hyperdiversity and its potential causes in the marine periwinkle Melarhaphe neritoides (Mollusca: Gastropoda)". PeerJ 4:e2549. 

Littorinidae
Gastropods described in 1758
Taxa named by Carl Linnaeus
Molluscs of the Atlantic Ocean
Molluscs of the Mediterranean Sea
Molluscs of the Azores
Molluscs of the Canary Islands
Gastropods of Cape Verde
Fauna of the Black Sea
Invertebrates of West Africa
Invertebrates of North Africa